The Liberal Party's Senior Whip was a political post in New Zealand. The whip's task was to administer the "whipping in" system that attempts to ensure that party MPs attend and vote according to the party leadership's wishes. All Liberal whips were members of the House of Representatives with none coming from the Legislative Council. The position held high esteem in the Liberal caucus and it was not uncommon for whips to move into higher positions later on. Two (William MacDonald and George Forbes) would later serve as party leader. Forbes also served as Prime Minister from 1930 to 1935.

List
The following is a list of senior whips of the Liberal Party (including United) up until the establishment of the National Party:

See also
Senior Whip of the Labour Party
Senior Whip of the National Party

Notes

References

New Zealand Liberal Party
Political whips